Alan, Allan or Allen Jenkins may refer to:

Allan Jenkins (footballer) (born 1981), Scottish footballer
Allan Jenkins, journalist for the British Observer Sunday newspaper
Allen Jenkins (1900–1974), American character actor
Alan Jenkins (poet) (born 1955), British poet; winner of the 1994 Forward Poetry Prize
Alan Jenkins (engineer) (born 1947), former designer with McLaren, and technical director of Footwork Arrows Formula One motor racing teams
Alan Jenkins (journalist), editor of The Herald of Glasgow, 1968–1971

See also
Al Jenkins (disambiguation)